The Farmer Takes a Wife is a 1934 play by Frank B. Elser and Marc Connelly based on the 1929 novel Rome Haul by Walter D. Edmonds. It was well-received upon its opening night on Broadway on October 30, 1934, at the 46th Street Theatre. The production was directed by Marc Connelly, used set designs by Donald Oenslager, and starred Henry Fonda as Dan Harrow and June Walker as Molly Larkins.

Film adaptations
The play spawned two film adaptations. The first, a 1935 comedy film, was directed by Victor Fleming, starred Janet Gaynor, and marked the Hollywood debut of Henry Fonda. Dan Harrow (Henry Fonda) works along the Erie Canal during the mid-19th century to raise money to buy a farm. While working, he meets Molly Larkins, a beautiful canal boat cook (Janet Gaynor). Although Harrow wants to marry Larkins, she's apprehensive about leaving the exciting canal life for one of a farmer's wife.

A 1953 musical remake used a score by Harold Arlen and Cyril J. Mockridge. The picture was directed by Henry Levin and starred Betty Grable, Dale Robertson, Eddie Foy, Jr., and Thelma Ritter.

External links
1953 Best Plays radio adaptation of original play at Internet Archive

1934 plays
Broadway plays
American plays adapted into films
Plays based on novels
Plays set in New York (state)